The 2021 Singapore Tennis Open is a tournament on the 2021 ATP Tour. It is played on indoor hard courts in Singapore. It is organised with a single-year licence in 2021, and was held at OCBC Arena in Singapore from February 22 to February 28, 2021.

Finals

Singles

  Alexei Popyrin def.  Alexander Bublik, 4–6, 6–0, 6–2.

Doubles

  Sander Gillé /  Joran Vliegen def.  Matthew Ebden /  John-Patrick Smith, 6–2, 6–3.

Points and prize money

Point distribution

Prize money 

*per team

Singles main-draw entrants

Seeds

1 Rankings are as of February 15, 2021

Other entrants
The following players received wildcards into the main draw:
  Adrian Andreev
  Matthew Ebden
  Shintaro Mochizuki

The following player received an entry using a protected ranking into the main draw:
  Yuki Bhambri

The following players received entry from the qualifying draw:
  Altuğ Çelikbilek
  Christopher Eubanks
  Thai-Son Kwiatkowski
  John-Patrick Smith

Withdrawals
  Félix Auger-Aliassime → replaced by  Alexei Popyrin
  Ričardas Berankis → replaced by  Marc Polmans
  Jérémy Chardy → replaced by  Ernests Gulbis
  Daniel Evans → replaced by  Yasutaka Uchiyama
  Cameron Norrie → replaced by  Taro Daniel
  Vasek Pospisil → replaced by  James Duckworth
  Casper Ruud → replaced by  Jason Jung
  Emil Ruusuvuori → replaced by  Roberto Marcora
  Yūichi Sugita → replaced by  Yuki Bhambri
  Stefano Travaglia → replaced by  Maxime Cressy

Doubles main-draw entrants

Seeds

 Rankings are as of February 15, 2021.

Other entrants
The following pairs received wildcards into the doubles main draw:
  Shaheed Alam /  Roy Hobbs
  James Cerretani /  Adil Shamasdin

Withdrawals 
Before the tournament
  Dan Evans /  Lloyd Glasspool → replaced by  Purav Raja /  Ramkumar Ramanathan
  Radu Albot /  Ričardas Berankis → replaced by  Robert Galloway /  Alex Lawson
  Harri Heliövaara /  Emil Ruusuvuori → replaced by  Taro Daniel /  Jason Jung
  Lloyd Harris /  Stefano Travaglia → replaced by  Evan King /  Hunter Reese
  Jérémy Chardy /  Fabrice Martin → replaced by  Sriram Balaji /  Luca Margaroli
  Treat Huey /  Christopher Rungkat → replaced by  Thai-Son Kwiatkowski /  Christopher Eubanks
During the tournament
  Kwon Soon-woo /  Yasutaka Uchiyama

References

External links

Singapore Tennis Open
Singapore Tennis Open
Singapore Tennis Openn
Singapore Tennis Open